Innovation forum may refer to:
 World Innovation Forum (New York), business summit held annually
 World Innovation Forum (Kuala Lumpur), summit held annually
 Wireless Innovation Forum, non-profit "mutual benefit corporation" dedicated to technologies
 Marketing Innovation Forum Europe, annual summit gathering managers
 Open Innovations (Forum and Technology Show), annual forum and exhibition dedicated to new technologies